Brett Robinson (born 24 January 1970) is an Australian rugby union administrator and former player. He was captain of the ACT Brumbies team in the Super 12 competition and played 16 Test matches for the Australia national rugby union team, the "Wallabies". Robinson attended Downlands College in Toowoomba.

References

External links 

Living people
1970 births
Australian rugby union players
Australia international rugby union players
ACT Brumbies players
Rugby union flankers
Rugby union players from Queensland